Pterorhopalus mizotai is a species of beetle in the family Carabidae, the only species in the genus Pterorhopalus.

References

Paussinae